Lesbian, gay, bisexual, transgender, and queer (LGBTQ) personnel are able to serve in the armed forces of some countries around the world: the vast majority of industrialized, Western countries including some South American countries such as Argentina and Chile in addition to South Africa, and Israel. The rights concerning intersex people are more vague.

This keeps pace with the latest global figures on acceptance of homosexuality, which suggest that acceptance of LGBTQ communities is becoming more widespread only in secular, affluent countries.

However, an accepting policy toward gay and lesbian soldiers does not invariably guarantee that LGBTQ citizens are immune to discrimination in that particular society. Even in countries where LGBTQ persons are free to serve in the military, activists lament that there remains room for improvement. Israel, for example, a country that otherwise struggles to implement LGBTQ-positive social policy, nevertheless has a military well known for its broad acceptance of openly gay soldiers.

History has seen societies that both embrace and shun openly gay service-members in the military. But more recently, the high-profile 2010 hearings on "Don't ask, don't tell" in the United States propelled the issue to the center of international attention. They also shed light both on the routine discrimination, violence, and hardship faced by LGBTQ-identified soldiers, as well as arguments for and against a ban on their service.

History

In ancient Greece, the Sacred Band of Thebes was a military unit from 378 BCE which consisted of male lovers who were known for their effectiveness in battle. Same-sex love also occurred among the Samurai class in Japan, being practiced between an adult and a younger apprentice.

However, homosexual behavior has been considered a criminal offense according to civilian and military law in most countries throughout history. There are various accounts of trials and executions of members of the Knights Templar in the fourteenth century and sailors during the Napoleonic Wars for homosexuality. Official bans on gays serving in the military first surfaced in the early 20th century. The U.S. introduced a ban in a revision of the Articles of War of 1916 and the UK first prohibited homosexuality in the Army and Air Force Acts in 1955. However some nations, of which Sweden is the most well-known case, never introduced bans on homosexuality in the military, but issued recommendations on exempting homosexuals from military service.

To regulate homosexuality in the U.S. military, physical exams and interviews were used to spot men with effeminate characteristics during recruitment. Many soldiers accused of homosexual behavior were discharged for being "sexual psychopaths", although the number of discharges greatly decreased during wartime efforts.

The rationale for excluding gays and lesbians from serving in the military is often rooted in cultural norms and values and has changed over time. Originally, it was believed that gays were not physically able to serve effectively. The pervading argument during the 20th century focused more on military effectiveness. And finally, more recent justifications include the potential for conflict between heterosexual and homosexual service members and possible "heterosexual resentment and hostility."

Many countries have since revised these policies and allow gays and lesbians to openly serve in the military (e.g. Israel in 1993 and the UK in 2000). There are currently more than 30 countries, including nearly all of the NATO members which allow gays and lesbians to serve and around 10 more countries that do not outwardly prohibit them from serving.

The U.S. was one of the last developed nations to overturn its ban on allowing gays, lesbians and bisexuals to openly serve in the military when it repealed the Don't Ask Don't Tell policy in 2010.

Being LGBT in the military
In the United States, despite policy changes allowing for open LGBQ military service and the provision of some benefits to same-sex military couples, cultures of homophobia and discrimination persist.

Several academics have written on the effects on employees in non-military contexts concealing their sexual orientation in the workplace. Writers on military psychology have linked this work to the experiences of LGBQ military service personnel, asserting that these studies offer insights into the lives of open LGBQ soldiers and those who conceal their orientation. Sexual orientation concealment and sexual orientation linked harassment are stressors for LGBT individuals that lead to negative experiences and deleterious job-related outcomes. Specifically, non-open LGBT persons are found to experience social isolation. In particular, these products of work related stress can affect military job performance, due to the high reliance on connection and support for the well-being of all service members.

In the United States, LGBQ soldiers are not required to disclose their sexual orientation, suggesting that some LGBQ service members may continue to conceal their sexual orientation. Studies suggest this could have harmful effects for the individual. A 2013 study conducted at the University of Montana found that non-open LGB US veterans face significantly higher rates of depression, posttraumatic stress disorder, and alcohol or other substance abuse than their heterosexual counterparts. These veterans also reported facing significant challenges serving while concealing their sexual orientation; 69.3% of subjects in the study reported experiencing fear or anxiety as a result of concealing their sexual identity, and 60.5% reported that those experiences led to a more difficult time for the respondent than heterosexual colleagues. This study also concludes that 14.7% of LGB American veterans made serious attempts at suicide. This rate of suicide attempts compares to another study of the entire American veteran community that found .0003% of American veterans attempt suicide.

Evidence suggests that for LGB service members in the United States, the conditions of service and daily life have improved dramatically following the repeal of Don't Ask, Don't Tell. Soldiers who choose to come out experience feelings of liberation, and report that no longer having to hide their orientation allows them to focus on their jobs. Support groups for LGB soldiers have also proliferated in the United States.

Discrimination
In the US army, six states (Texas, Georgia, Louisiana, Mississippi, Oklahoma and West Virginia) initially refused to comply with Defense Secretary Chuck Hagel's order that gay spouses of National Guard members be given the same federal marriage benefits as heterosexual spouses, forcing couples to travel hours round trip to the nearest federal installation. Furthermore, some benefits offered on bases, like support services for relatives of deployed service members, could still be blocked. This changed with a ruling by US Attorney General Loretta Lynch in the Supreme Court on 26 June 2015 which ruled that Federal marriage benefits would be made available to gay couples in all 50 US states.

In 2013, legal changes were said to revert to practices to those before Don't Ask, Don't Tell, the National Defense Authorization Act contains language some claimed permitted individuals to continue discriminating against LGB soldiers.

From June 30, 2016, to April 11, 2019, transgender personnel in the United States military were allowed to serve in their preferred gender upon completing transition. From January 1, 2018, to April 11, 2019, transgender individuals could enlist in the United States military under the condition of being stable for 18 months in their preferred or biological gender.  On July 26, 2017, President Donald Trump announced on his Twitter page that transgender individuals would no longer be allowed "to serve in any capacity in the U.S. Military", effectively reinstating the ban.

Further, throughout the US army, transgender people are still suffering from discrimination: they are prohibited from serving openly because of medical regulations that label them as mentally unstable. On the contrary, in Australia, Canada, Germany, Israel, Italy, the Netherlands, and United Kingdom, as of 2010, when civil partnerships became legal in the respective countries, military family benefits followed the new laws, without discrimination.

Fear of discrimination may prevent military service members to be open about their sexual orientation. A 2004 report stated that in some cases, in Belgium, homosexual personnel have been transferred from their unit if they have been "too open with their sexuality." , the Belgian military reserved the right to deny gay and lesbian personnel high-level security clearances, for fear they may be susceptible to blackmail. In 1993, a study showed that in Canada, France, Germany, Israel, the Netherlands and Norway, the number of openly homosexual service members was small, representing only a minority of homosexuals usually serving. Serving openly may make their service less pleasant or impede their careers, even though there were no explicit limitations to serve. Thus service members who acknowledged their homosexuality were "appropriately" circumspect in their behavior while in military situations; i.e. they did not call attention to themselves. Today, in the Danish army, LGBT military personnel refrain from being completely open about their homosexuality. Until training is completed and a solid employment is fixed they fear losing respect, authority and privileges, or in worse cases their job in the Danish army.
In 2010, the same updated study showed that in Australia, Canada, Germany, Israel, Italy and United Kingdom, no special treatment to prevent discrimination was in place in those armies, the issue is not specifically addressed, it is left to the leadership discretion. Commanders said that sexual harassment of women by men poses a far greater threat to unit performance than anything related to sexual orientation.

On the other hand, the Dutch military directly addressed the issue of enduring discrimination, by forming the Homosexuality and Armed Forces Foundation, a trade union that continues to represent gay and lesbian personnel to the ministry of defense, for a more tolerant military culture. Although homosexuals in the Dutch military rarely experience any explicitly aggressive acts against them, signs of homophobia and cultural insensitivity are still present.

Violence

Physical, sexual, psychological (harassment, bullying) violence faced by LGBT is a fact of life for many LGBT identified persons. In an inherently violent environment, LGBT people may face violence unique to their community in the course of military service.

According to a 2012 news article, the Israeli Defense Force does not ask the sexual orientation of its soldiers, however half of the homosexual soldiers who serve in the IDF suffer from violence and homophobia. LGBT soldiers are often victims of verbal and physical violence and for the most part, commanders ignore the phenomenon.

SAPRO, the organization responsible for the oversight of the Department of Defense (DoD - USA) sexual assault policy, produces the "Workplace and Gender Relations Survey of Active Duty Member (WGRA)": The 2012 report does not have any paragraph studying the specific situation of LGBT people. The study focuses on men and women. The specificity of the violence faced by LGBT people is not considered.

In the Australian army, the problem is not known officially; only a few cases of harassment and discrimination involving gays and lesbians have been recorded. A researcher mentioned that "one would not want to be gay and in the military": Although there has been no major public scandal regarding harassment of gays, this does not mean that such behavior does not occur, but it has been under-studied. Generally, however, incidents of discrimination or harassment brought to the attention of commanders are handled appropriately, incidents in which peers who had made inappropriate remarks are disciplined by superiors promptly and without reservation.

In the United States military, sexual violence in the form of harassment and assault affects a large percentage of its LGBT soldiers. Research conducted through an online survey and published in the Journal of Traumatic Stress shows that 80.7% of LGB and 83.9% of transgender service members, reported experiencing sexual harassment during their time in the military. The survey also found that 25.7% of LGB and 30.4% of transgender service members reported experiencing sexual assault. These researchers concluded that their findings pointed to LGBT service members being at a higher risk of sexual and/or stalking victimization.

These forms of sexual victimization against LGBT U.S. military service members have been linked to adverse mental health effects ranging from depressive symptoms to suicidal behavior. LGBT veterans experienced posttraumatic stress disorder (PTSD), depressive symptoms, substance use, and suicidal behavior among other mental health issues oftentimes at a higher rate than non-LGBT veterans. It was found that depression, anxiety, and substance use disorders are 1.5 times more common in the LGBT community as well as evidence that supports the thought that members of the LGBT community who have gone through physical, sexual, and emotional trauma have a higher risk of suicide. The statistics reflect that 11.48% of LGB veterans reported that they had "seriously considered" attempting suicide within the past year, compared to 3.48% of heterosexual veterans. According to national data from the Vietnam Era Twin Registry, when looking at veterans who had at least one same-gendered sexual partner in their lifetime, 55.3% of them reported suicidal ideation, compared to just 25.2% of those with no same-gender partners. In terms of attempting suicide, among the veterans surveyed with at least one same-gender partner, 14.7% reported they had attempted, compared to just 3.9% of veterans with no same-gender partner. In veterans who could not or did not serve openly in the military, they were found to suffer from higher rates of depression and PTSD specifically associated with concealing their sexual orientation while in the service.

There are mental health care options available for LGBT veterans, but studies show that those in need of care may avoid it due to past experiences or fear of stigma in healthcare settings, or the belief that healthcare professionals are not equipped to meet their needs due to lack of training. Studies have supported this hypothesis by looking at physicians’ "knowledge, attitudes, and perceptions of their clinical competence," finding that many are, or at least think they are, inadequately prepared to properly care for patients that identify as LGBT and/or are veterans.

Arguments regarding inclusion

Arguments for inclusion

Until recently, many countries banned gays and lesbians from serving openly in the armed forces. The reasons to enforce this ban included the potential negative impact on unit cohesion and privacy concerns. However, many studies commissioned to examine the effects on the military found that little evidence existed to support the discriminatory policy. Moreover, when the bans were repealed in several countries including the UK, Canada, and Australia, no large scale issues arose as a result.

Several studies provide evidence that allowing gays and lesbians to openly serve in the armed forces can result in more positive work related outcomes. Firstly, discharging trained military personnel for their sexual orientation is costly and results in loss of talent. The total cost for such discharges in the U.S for violating the Don't Ask Don't Tell policy amounted to more than 290 million dollars. Secondly, privacy for service members has actually increased in countries with inclusive policies and led to a decrease in harassment. Although it is important to note that many gays and lesbians do not disclose their sexual orientation once the ban is repealed. Finally, allowing gays to openly serve ends decades of discrimination in the military and can lead to a more highly qualified pool of recruits. For instance, the British military reduced its unfilled position gap by more than half after allowing gays to openly serve.
Therefore, more evidence exists now to support policies that allow gays and lesbians to openly serve in the military.

Arguments against inclusion 
While most research data have all but debunked traditional arguments in favor of policies like Don't Ask, Don't Tell, homosexuality is still perceived by many countries to be incompatible with military service.

A recurrent argument for a ban on homosexuals in the military rests on the assumption that, in the face of potentially homosexual members of their unit, prospective recruits would shy away from military service. Based on an inconclusive study produced by the RAND Corporation in the run-up to the repeal of Don't Ask, Don't Tell, American military recruits were expected to decrease by as much as 7%. However, this does not appear to have materialized.

In a line of work that regularly demands that personnel be in close living quarters, allowing openly homosexual servicemen is argued to flout a fundamental tenet of military service: ensuring that soldiers remain undistracted from their mission. If gay men are allowed to shower with their fellow male soldiers, so goes the argument, this would, in effect, violate the "unique conditions" of military life by putting sexually compatible partners in close proximity, with potentially adverse effects on retention and morale of troops. Testimony advanced during the hearings on Don't Ask, Don't Tell of 1993, with US Senator Sam Nunn and General Norman Schwarzkopf Jr. recalled "instances where heterosexuals have been solicited to commit homosexual acts, and, even more traumatic emotionally, physically coerced to engage in such acts".

Transgender military service

Like sexual orientation, policies regulating the service of transgender military personnel vary greatly by country. Based on data collected by the Hague Centre for Strategic Studies nineteen countries currently allow transgender people to serve in their military. They are: Australia, Austria, Belgium, Bolivia, Brazil, Canada, Czech Republic, Denmark, Estonia, Finland, France, Germany, Israel, Netherlands, New Zealand, Norway, Spain, Sweden, and the United Kingdom.

While the US military's Don't Ask, Don't Tell policy was rescinded in 2011 allowing open service by gay, lesbian, and bisexual service members, transgender people were still barred from entering the US military. This ban, which was subsequently removed, was effective via enlistment health screening regulations: "Current or history of psychosexual conditions (302), including but not limited to transsexualism, exhibitionism, transvestism, voyeurism, and other paraphilias." Unlike Don't Ask, Don't Tell, this policy was not a law mandated by Congress, but an internal military policy. Studies suggest that the propensity of trans individuals to serve in the US military is as much as twice that as cisgender individuals. In the Harvard Kennedy School's 2013 National Transgender Discrimination Survey, 20% of transgender respondents reported having served in the armed forces, compared with 10% of cisgender respondents.

American transgender veterans face institutional hardships, including the provision of medical care while in the armed services and after discharge stemming from their gender identity or expression. Transgender veterans may also face additional challenges, such as facing a higher rate of homelessness and home foreclosure, higher rates of losing jobs often directly stemming from their trans identity, and high rates of not being hired for specific jobs because of their gender identity.

Intersex military service

The armed forces of Israel, the United States and Australia have employed intersex individuals depending on the nature of their conditions, but the guidelines are vague and seldom talked about.

LGBT Military Index
The LGBT Military Index is an index created by the Hague Centre for Strategic Studies that uses 19 indicative policies and best practices to rank over 100 countries on the inclusion of lesbian, gay, bisexual and transgender service members in the armed forces. Countries with higher rankings, especially the ones at the top, stand out for their multiple concerted efforts to promote the inclusion of gay and lesbian soldiers. In many of them special support and advocacy organizations are present. By contrast, countries near the bottom of the index show the lack of aspiration to promote greater inclusion of the LGBT military personnel.

By country

See also
LGBT healthcare in the United States Veterans Health Administration

References

Sources
Shilts, Randy (1994/1997/2005). Conduct Unbecoming: Gays and Lesbians in the US Military.  / .

Further reading
 
 
Burg, B. R. (2002) Gay Warriors: A Documentary History from the Ancient World to the Present (New York University Press, 2002)
 De Angelis, Karin, et al. (2013) "Sexuality in the military." in International Handbook on the Demography of Sexuality (Springer Netherlands, 2013) pp 363–381.
 Frank, Nathaniel, ed. (2010) Gays in foreign militaries 2010: A global primer online
 Frank, Nathaniel. (2013) "The President's Pleasant Surprise: How LGBT Advocates Ended Don't Ask, Don't Tell," Journal of homosexuality 60, no. 2-3 (2013): 159–213.
 Frank, Nathaniel. (2009) Unfriendly Fire: How the Gay Ban Undermines the Military and Weakens America
 Okros, Alan, and Denise Scott. (2014) "Gender Identity in the Canadian Forces A Review of Possible Impacts on Operational Effectiveness." Armed Forces & Society 0095327X14535371.
 Polchar, Joshua, et al. (2014) LGBT Military: A Strategic Vision for Inclusion (The Hague Centre for Strategic Studies, 2014)

External links
 The Palm Center, University of California, Santa Barbara.
 Center for Military Readiness, Livonia, MI, Non-profit educational organization focusing on traditionalist military personnel policy: see Center for Military Readiness
 Military Culture: European
 Center for the Study of Sexual Minorities in the Military of the University of California, Santa Barbara
 ArmyLGBT.org.uk: Website of the British Army's LGBT Employee Network
 Defence Gay and Lesbian Information Service - Australia
 Modern Military Association of America, US Site for serving LGBTQ soldiers
 Human Rights Watch report: Uniform Discrimination The Don't Ask, Don't Tell Policy of the U.S. Military
 Blue Alliance – LGBT Alumni of the US Air Force Academy
 History of gay and lesbian discrimination in Canadian Military
 Watch Open Secrets, a National Film Board of Canada documentary on homosexuals in the military during World War II

Military service
Sexual orientation
Military service